The Portland–Columbia Pedestrian Bridge (formally known  as the Portland-Columbia Toll Supported Pedestrian Bridge) is a footbridge that crosses the Delaware River, at Portland, Pennsylvania, connecting to Columbia, in Knowlton Township, New Jersey, United States. The bridge is owned and operated by the Delaware River Joint Toll Bridge Commission.

History
A vehicular bridge had been located at the site of the present bridge since 1869. The original structure was a four-span timber bridge with wooden arches which was covered by a wooden shed with a slate roof. It was a private toll bridge until 1927.

As of December 1, 1953, the bridge on the site was closed to vehicular traffic, which was shifted to the new Portland-Columbia Toll Bridge, built one-quarter mile downstream of the old bridge.

In August 1955, during the remnants of Hurricane Diane, three of the four spans of the timber bridge washed away.  Hurricane Diane was the wettest hurricane to ever hit the North American continent and caused record flooding throughout the northeastern US, but particularly the Delaware River watershed. 
 
Starting in 1957, the bridge was reconstructed as a four-span steel girder bridge system with concrete piers. New guide rails were added in 1996, and an ADA-compliant access ramp were added to the New Jersey side.

References

External links
 Portland-Columbia Toll Supported Pedestrian Bridge page at the Delaware River Joint Toll Bridge Commission website
 
 

Delaware River Joint Toll Bridge Commission
Bridges over the Delaware River
Bridges completed in 1869
Covered bridges in New Jersey
Covered bridges in Warren County in New Jersey
Covered bridges in Pennsylvania
Covered bridges in Northampton County, Pennsylvania
Bridges completed in 1957
Bridges in Warren County, New Jersey
Former road bridges in the United States
Wooden bridges in Pennsylvania
Bridges in Northampton County, Pennsylvania
Wooden bridges in New Jersey
Pedestrian bridges in New Jersey
Road bridges in New Jersey
Road bridges in Pennsylvania
Pedestrian bridges in Pennsylvania
Knowlton Township, New Jersey
Former toll bridges in New Jersey
Former toll bridges in Pennsylvania
1869 establishments in Pennsylvania
1869 establishments in New Jersey